Zhengxiangbai Banner or Xulun Hobot Qagan Banner, also known as the Plain and Bordered White Banner (Mongolian:     Шулуун Хөвөөт Цагаан хошуу Siluɣun Köbegetü Čaɣan qosiɣu) is a banner (administrative division) of Inner Mongolia, China, bordering Hebei province to the south. It is under the administration of Xilin Gol League.

Climate

References

External links
www.xzqh.org 

County-level divisions of Inner Mongolia